Qush-e Alijan (also Romanized as Qūsh-e ‘Alījān; also known as Qūsh-e ‘Alī Khān) is a village in Sarakhs Rural District, in the Central District of Sarakhs County, Razavi Khorasan Province, Iran. At the 2006 census, its population was 848, in 190 families.

References 

Populated places in Sarakhs County